The ZIL-2906 (Russian: ЗИЛ-2906) is a screw-driven amphibious craft manufactured in Soviet Union from 1975 to 1979 by ZiL. The ZIL-2906 was produced from July 1975 to 1979. In 1980, it was succeeded by the ZIL-29061, produced until 1991.

These vehicles are notable for being Screw-propelled vehicles (in Russian: шнекохо́д), allowing it to traverse inhospitable terrains. The vehicle was designed to recover re-entered Soyuz space capsules from difficult terrain. 

The ZIL-2906 was carried on the back of a ZIL-4906 (which had a top speed of ) until it reached terrain impassable for the latter, such as conventional asphalt roads. At this point the ZIL-2906 would be unloaded and resume the search.

Specifications

Mass
 
Maximum speed
 Water - 
 Swamp - 
 Snow - 
Dimensions
 Length - 
 Width - 
 Height -

References

External links

 ZIL-2906 on YouTube

Soyuz program

Amphibious vehicles
ZiL vehicles